William Hogan III is an American retired ice hockey Center who was an All-American for Boston College.

Career
Like his father before him, Bill Hogan played college hockey for the Eagles under head coach John Kelley. In his sophomore season, Hogan helped the Eagles compile a 19–5–1 record, but the team was passed over for the NCAA Tournament. The very next season BC joined with 27 other eastern teams to form ECAC Hockey and the Eagles set their sights on another postseason bid. Hogan led the Eagles in goals (24) and points (45) and was named an All-American and First Team All-ECAC. The Eagles made the inaugural conference tournament as the 5th seed and were defeated in the quarterfinal.

In his senior season, Hogan increased his point production again, rising to 59 points and leading the Eagles into the conference tournament as the No. 1 seed. The Eagles reached the finals and played a tight contest against long-time rival Harvard, ultimately falling 3–4 in overtime. Because the ECAC possessed every top Division team in the east, Boston College was nearly assured a bid into the tournament as the second seed and when Harvard declined the invitation (the only conference champion to ever do so) they were given the top eastern seed. Despite high hopes, the Eagles played poorly in the championship, losing the semifinal 2–8 to North Dakota and then dropping the consolation game to Clarkson. Hogan received a consolation after the season by receiving the Walter Brown Award given to the best American-born college hockey player in the East.

Hogan was inducted into the Boston College Athletic Hall of Fame in 1979.

Career statistics

Regular season and playoffs

Awards and honors

References

External links

Year of birth missing (living people)
Living people
American ice hockey centers
Ice hockey players from Massachusetts
People from Belmont, Massachusetts
Sportspeople from Middlesex County, Massachusetts
Boston College Eagles men's ice hockey players
AHCA Division I men's ice hockey All-Americans